Arthur Loft (May 25, 1897 – January 1, 1947) was an American film and stage actor. He appeared in more than 220 films between 1932 and 1947.

Biography 
He was born in Denver, Colorado and died in Los Angeles, California. He is interred at Glendale's Forest Lawn Memorial Park Cemetery.

Career 
In 1931, Loft performed with the Hale-Munier Players.

Selected filmography

Behind Jury Doors (1932)
 Alimony Madness (1933)
 Western Justice (1934)
 Paradise Valley (1934)
 Girl in the Case (1934)
 Danger Ahead (1935)
 Wanted! Jane Turner (1936)
 King of the Royal Mounted (1936)
 Shakedown (1936)
 All American Sweetheart (1937)
 The Great Barrier (1937)
 Paid to Dance (1937)
 Motor Madness (1937)
 The Main Event (1938)
 Rawhide (1938)
 Rhythm of the Saddle (1938)
 Squadron of Honor (1938)
 Cafe Hostess (1939)
 A Woman Is the Judge (1939)
 Teddy, the Rough Rider (1940)
 Colorado (1940)
 Glamour for Sale (1940)
 The Green Hornet Strikes Again! (1941)
 Caught in the Draft (1941)
 Down Mexico Way (1941)
 The Magnificent Dope (1942)
 The Glass Key (1942)
 Street of Chance (1942) - Sheriff Lew Stebbins
 Let's Face It (1943)
 Louisiana Hayride (1944) 
 The Woman in the Window (1944)
 She Gets Her Man (1945)
 The Man from Oklahoma (1945)
 Scarlet Street (1945) - Dellarowe
 It's a Pleasure (1945) - Jack Weimar
 Blondie Knows Best (1946)

References

External links

 
 
 

1897 births
1947 deaths
American male film actors
Male actors from Colorado
20th-century American male actors

Burials at Forest Lawn Memorial Park (Glendale)
American male stage actors